Raymond Charles Morstadt (March 10, 1913 – July 5, 1965) was an American professional basketball player. He played for the Akron Goodyear Wingfoots in the National Basketball League and averaged 3.5 points per game.

References

1913 births
1965 deaths
Akron Goodyear Wingfoots players
All-American college men's basketball players
Amateur Athletic Union men's basketball players
American men's basketball players
Basketball players from Illinois
Centers (basketball)
Forwards (basketball)
Marquette Golden Avalanche football players
Marquette Golden Eagles men's basketball players
Sportspeople from Waukegan, Illinois